Metaperipatus is a genus of velvet worms in the family Peripatopsidae that includes the species Metaperipatus inae. Males of this species have 20 pairs of legs; females have 22 pairs. This species is a dark grayish blue in color, with large orange/red spots. When walking, females of this species can be as long as 85 mm, and males can be as long as 60 mm. The type locality is in central Chile.

A second species assigned to this genus, M. blainvillei (Gervais, 1837), includes females with 20 to 22 pairs of legs and males with 19 to 22, but M. blainvillei is considered a nomen dubium by Oliveira et al., 2012, because it is probably a species complex.

Velvet worms in this genus exhibit matrotrophic viviparity, that is, mothers in this genus retain eggs in their uteri and supply nourishment to their embryos, but without any placenta.

References

Further reading

Onychophorans of temperate America
Onychophoran genera
Endemic fauna of Chile